Receptor expression-enhancing protein 1 is a protein that in humans is encoded by the REEP1 gene.

References

Further reading